Attlee Glacier is a glacier  long, which flows east-southeast from the plateau escarpment on the east side of Graham Land to the head of Cabinet Inlet to the north of Bevin Glacier.

History
Attlee Glacier  was charted, in December 1947, from the ground by the Falkland Islands Dependencies Survey (FIDS) and photographed from the air by the Ronne Antarctic Research Expedition. It was named by the FIDS for Rt. Hon. Clement Attlee, M.P., British Secretary of State for Dominion Affairs, member of the War Cabinet, and later Prime Minister of the United Kingdom.

See also
 List of glaciers in the Antarctic
 Glaciology

References
 

Glaciers of Graham Land
Foyn Coast